Josh Wirt (born October 9, 1984) is an American former ice sledge hockey player. He won a gold medal with Team USA at the 2002 Winter Paralympics.

References

Living people
1984 births
Paralympic sledge hockey players of the United States
American sledge hockey players
Paralympic gold medalists for the United States
Medalists at the 2002 Winter Paralympics
Paralympic medalists in sledge hockey
Ice sledge hockey players at the 2002 Winter Paralympics